Deep Shock is a 2003 American science-fiction-horror film that debuted as a Sci Fi Pictures TV-movie on the Sci Fi Channel. Its plot concerns an unknown underwater object that disables an American nuclear-powered submarine and attacks a submerged Arctic research complex. The monsters of the movie are giant intelligent electric eels.

Plot
The US Navy nuclear-powered attack submarine  is attacked by a mysterious underwater object that stalks and disables the Seawolf-class super-sub with a powerful electromagnetic pulse. The underwater Arctic research complex Hubris witnesses the attack and reports a rapid rise in the temperature of the Polaris Trench which threatens to melt the ice cap and flood the world's land surface. At an emergency United Nations scientific conference, Hubris director Dr. Ann Fletcher is dismissed when she urges caution and her archrival Dr. Chomsky pushes through a far more aggressive plan to deal with the crisis. When Chomsky's plan fails and contact with the Hubris complex is lost, Dr. Fletcher is asked to participate in a follow-up expedition, which also includes Chomsky, by her ex-husband, Navy Captain Andy Raines. Once at the North Pole, the expedition finds that the Hubris complex is completely intact, but its personnel have been incinerated.

Cast
 David Keith as Captain Andy Raines, USN
 Simmone Jade Mackinnon as Dr. Anne Fletcher
 Mark Sheppard as Dr. Chomsky
 Sean Whalen as Arciero
 Armando Valdés as Protas
 Robert Zachar as Michael (as Bob Zachar)
 Richard Gnolfo as Rodgers
 Todd Kimsey as Hurst
 Tyrone Pinkham as Beach
 Velizar Binev as Dr. Pashe
 Ivaylo Geraskov as Russian G-8 Representative
 Anatoly Nechev as French G-8 Representative

Production
Deep Shock was produced by DEJ Productions, Unified Film Organization and Eel Productions, LLC in association with Media Entertainment GMBH & CO 1. Filmproduktions KG.

External links
Deep Shock official site (Sci Fi Channel. Archived from the original on June 7, 2004

 
 
 Deep Shock film trailer at YouTube

2003 television films
2003 films
2000s science fiction horror films
Films shot in Bulgaria
Giant monster films
Science fiction submarine films
Syfy original films
American horror television films
2000s English-language films
2000s American films